Mile End railway station is located on the Belair, Seaford and Flinders lines adjacent to the inner western Adelaide suburb of Mile End. There is easy access from Ellis Park, Adelaide Park Lands, but access from Mile End is limited.

History
The station opened in 1898, and was formerly known as Mile End Passenger station.

In late 2016, the station was ranked as the worst station in the western suburbs based on 5 criteria. The reasons cited were: "No toilets or other amenities on platform, or nearby. The shelter on platform four is particularly unworthy of its name." The station now mainly services the Belair line trains from the two western platforms and Seaford and Flinders from the East Platforms. Before 2014, when the Goodwood underpass was constructed the station serviced the Belair line trains from the East and Seaford (then Noarlunga) and Flinders (then Tonsley) from the West. This was changed because the Goodwood underpass was constructed allowing Interstate trains to Melbourne and Belair line trains to pass over the Seaford and Flinders line freely without disturbance from Seaford and Flinders Passenger trains.

Controversy
Mile End station has received much criticism throughout the past few years for several reasons. Excepting park access, the station is only accessible from Mile End by a very old and narrow underpass. Furthermore, pedestrian access also features a three-track railway level crossing. The platforms themselves are narrow, too short and feature old waiting shelters which are in bad need of replacement. The station's level crossing is long and narrow and before reaching the platforms passengers occasionally have to wait several minutes for trains to pass. The station also does not feature any on station passenger information other than timetables. There are no toilets. The platforms are too short for a coupled A-City 4000 class train set which run on special event days. The other platform is shortened for Belair line trains which run in 2 car sets.

Services by platform

See also 
 Mile End Goods railway station

References

External links
 

Railway stations in Adelaide
Railway stations in Australia opened in 1898